Tülau is a municipality in the district of Gifhorn, in Lower Saxony, Germany. The Municipality Tülau includes the villages of Tülau-Fahrenhorst and Voitze.

References

Gifhorn (district)